Rabi Raj Thapa (born 19 December 1953) is a Nepalese boxer. He competed in the men's flyweight event at the 1980 Summer Olympics. At the 1980 Summer Olympics, he lost to János Váradi of Hungary.

References

External links
 

1953 births
Living people
Nepalese male boxers
Olympic boxers of Nepal
Boxers at the 1980 Summer Olympics
Place of birth missing (living people)
Flyweight boxers